Puttalam is a district situated near to the west coast of Sri Lanka. Along with the Kurunegala District, it formulates the North Western Province of Sri Lanka. The district capital is Puttalam, which borders the Kala Oya and Modaragam Aru in the north, Anuradhapura District and Kurunegala District in the east, Ma Oya in the south, and the Indian Ocean in the west. Puttalam is well known for its picturesque lagoons, popular for shallow sea fishing and prawn farming activities. The town of Kalpitiya, and the Kalpitiya Peninsula, is located in this district.

History 

In 1845, North Western Province was created.
In 1958, then Puttalam district was merged with Chilaw district.

Geography 
Puttalam district is situated in the upper part of the western coastal belt.

Administrative Structure 
There are 548 GN division in the area. These areas are governed by the 16 Divisional Secretary areas.

List of Divisional Secretary areas in Puttlam district 

 Anamaduwa Divisional Secretariat
 Arachchikattuwa Divisional Secretariat
 Chilaw Divisional Secretariat
 Dankotuwa Divisional Secretariat
 Kalpitiya Divisional Secretariat
 Karuwalagaswewa Divisional Secretariat
 Madampe Divisional Secretariat
 Mahakumbukkadawala Divisional Secretariat
 Mahawewa Divisional Secretariat
 Mundalama Divisional Secretariat
 Nattandiya Divisional Secretariat
 Nawagattegama Divisional Secretariat
 Pallama Divisional Secretariat
 Puttalam Divisional Secretariat
 Vanathavilluwa Divisional Secretariat
 Wennappuwa Divisional Secretariat

Religion

Puttalam district is a multi-religious area. Buddhism is the major religion in the district. It has established since the early part of the Anuradhapura kingdom. The second commonest religion is the Roman Catholics. In addition to two of the above major religions Hinduism, Christianity and Islam are well established in the area. Munneswaram Hindu Temple, St. Anne's Church Thalawila are some of the historical religious places in the area.

Major cities

 Puttalam (Urban Council)
 Chilaw (Urban Council)

Other towns

 Anamaduwa
 Battuluoya
 Dankotuwa
 Eluvankulam
 Kalpitiya
 Madampe
 Mahawewa
 Marawila
 Mundel
 Nattandiya
 Nuraicholai
 Palavi
 Thillayadi
 Wennappuwa
Katuneriya
Nainamadama

See also 
 Districts of Sri Lanka

References 

 
Districts of Sri Lanka